Western Michigan Christian High School (commonly Western Michigan Christian, WMCHS, or WMC) is a 7-12 private, Calvinist Christian school in Muskegon, Michigan, United States. It is accredited by the Michigan Association of Non-Public Schools, and is a member of Christian Schools International (CSI).

History
Founded in 1948, the school is owned by the parents of the students it serves.

Extracurricular activities
WMCHS has 17 athletic teams, drama, chapel, music programs, student council, numerous clubs as well as other voluntary student activities.

WMCHS won its third consecutive Class D state title in basketball, 9th all-time, March 27, 2010.

Notable alumni

Kate Reinders – (Class of 1998), born in Seattle, Washington, is an American musical theatre actress, and has performed as lead and understudy in several Broadway shows.
Dan Bylsma - (Class of 1988), played for the National Hockey League's Los Angeles Kings and Mighty Ducks of Anaheim, co-wrote several books with his father, and coached the Pittsburgh Penguins and Buffalo Sabres.
Joel DeLass - (Class of 2005), plays professional soccer for the Dayton Dutch Lions of the United Soccer Leagues as of 2011.

References

External links 
 

Christian schools in Michigan
Educational institutions established in 1948
1948 establishments in Michigan
Private high schools in Michigan
Buildings and structures in Muskegon, Michigan
Schools in Muskegon County, Michigan